Live Hearts is the first live album by the Irish folk rock band Moving Hearts, recorded on 28 February 1983 at the Dominion Theatre London by the Rolling Stones Mobile Unit. Steve Turner produced and engineered the album.

Track listing

Side one
"McBrides" (Dónal Lunny, Declan Sinnott, Eoghan O'Neill)
"2–1 Freddie" (Mick Hanly, Lunny, Sinnott)
"Downtown" (Davy Spillane)
"All I Remember" (Hanly)
"Open Those Gates" (Hanly, Lunny, Sinnott)

Side two
"Strain of the Dance" (J. McCarthy)
"What Will You Do About Me" (Jesse Oris Farrow)
"Let Somebody Know" (Sinnott)
"Lake of Shadows" (Lunny, Sinnott, O'Neill)

Personnel
Dónal Lunny – bouzouki, synthesiser, vocals
Mick Hanly – vocals, guitar, 
Eoghan O'Neill – bass, vocals
Declan Sinnott – guitar, vocals
Davy Spillane – uilleann pipes, low whistle
Keith Donald – soprano & tenor saxophones 
Matt Kelleghan – drums, percussion

References

External links
 Official website.

1983 live albums
Moving Hearts albums